Pir Sohrab Rural District is a rural district (dehestan) in Pir Sohrab District, Chabahar County, Sistan and Baluchestan Province, Iran. At the 2006 census, its population was 20,281, in 3,798 families.  The rural district has 111 villages. At the 2016 census, its population was 18,201.

References 

Chabahar County
Rural Districts of Sistan and Baluchestan Province
Populated places in Chabahar County